The Man on the Box is a 1914 American silent comedy-drama film directed by Oscar Apfel and co-directed by Cecil B. DeMille. It was based on the 1904 novel of the same name by Harold MacGrath and stars Horace B. Carpenter.

Max Figman had starred in the Broadway version in 1907 and reprises his role here in this film. A surviving film at the Library of Congress and the Wisconsin Center for Film and Theater Research (Madison).

Cast
 Horace B. Carpenter as Russian ambassador
 Jane Darwell as Mrs. Chadwick
 William Elmer as Troop commander
 Max Figman as Lt. Bob Warburton
 Harry Fisher as Chales Henderson
 Betty Johnson as Nancy Warburton (as Betty Jonson)
 Jack W. Johnston as Count Karloff (as J.W. Johnston)
 C. F. Le None as Scout
 Fred Montague as Col. Raleigh
 James Neill as Col. Annesley
 Lolita Robertson as Betty Annesley
 Mabel Van Buren as Kit Warburton

References

External links

1914 films
1914 comedy-drama films
1910s English-language films
American silent feature films
American black-and-white films
Famous Players-Lasky films
Films based on American novels
Films directed by Cecil B. DeMille
Films directed by Oscar Apfel
1910s American films
Silent American comedy-drama films